All Mad About Him (French: Toutes folles de lui) is a 1967 French-Italian comedy film directed by Norbert Carbonnaux and starring Robert Hirsch, Sophie Desmarets and Maria Latour.

The film's sets were designed by the art directors Georges Wakhévitch. It was shot in Eastmancolor. Future star Edwige Fenech made her screen debut in the film.

Cast
 Robert Hirsch as Mathieu Gossin 
 Sophie Desmarets as Hélène Maccard 
 Maria Latour as Lily 
 Jacqueline Coué as Mélina 
 Julien Guiomar as Antoine Bascou 
 Jean-Pierre Marielle as Le Révérend-Père Fouquet 
 Hélène Dieudonné as La marquise 
 Georges Chamarat as Maître Liotard 
 Yvette Lebon as Nine 
 Colette Mareuil as Marlène 
 Jean-Jacques Delbo as L'attaché 
 Marisa Merlini as Allegra 
 Sylvie Bréal as Marisa 
 Judith Magre as La voyante 
 Amarande as La teinturière 
 Danièle Domenge as La barmaid 
 Maria Siraco as La comptable 
 Edwige Fenech as Gina 
 José Plaza as Le ténor 
 Claude Lombardo as Lino 
 Amler as Le barman romain 
 Josiane Pabien as L'employée du pressing 
 Arthur Mauge as Le prince arabe 
 Jacqueline Richier as Une italienne 
 Michèle Menu as Une italienne

References

Bibliography 
 Peter Cowie & Derek Elley. World Filmography: 1967. Fairleigh Dickinson University Press, 1977.

External links 
 

1967 films
French comedy films
Italian comedy films
1967 comedy films
1960s French-language films
Films directed by Norbert Carbonnaux
Films with screenplays by Michel Audiard
1960s French films
1960s Italian films